Yamagata may refer to:

Places

Japan
Yamagata Prefecture, a prefecture of Japan in the Tōhoku region on Honshu island
Yamagata, Yamagata, the capital city of Yamagata Prefecture
Yamagata Airport (IATA code GAJ), an airport located in Yamagata
Yamagata Shinkansen, one of Shinkansen lines running between Tokyo Station and Shinjo Station
Yamagata Station, the main train station of Yamagata City
Yamagata (ski jump hill), an FIS-certified hill at Yamagata Zao Onsen Ski Resort
Yamagata, Gifu, a city in Gifu Prefecture
Yamagata, Nagano, a village in Higashichikuma District, Nagano, Japan
Yamagata, Iwate, a village in Iwate Prefecture
Yamagata District, Hiroshima, a district in Hiroshima Prefecture
Yamagata District, Gifu, a former district of Gifu Prefecture
Yamagata, Ibaraki, a city in Ibaraki Prefecture
Yamagata Domain, a Japanese feudal domain in Dewa Province
Yamagata Castle, a castle in Japan

Elsewhere
Yamagata Ridge, a nunatak in Oates Land, Antarctica

Other uses
Yamagata (surname)
7039 Yamagata, a main-belt asteroid
Montedio Yamagata, a J. League club based in Yamagata Prefecture
Yamagata (Akira), a fictional character in the anime film Akira
Yamagata dialect, the local dialect spoken in Yamagata Prefecture, Japan
B/Yamagata, lineage of Betainfluenzavirus

See also